Make It Work! is an American television special premiered on The CW on August 26, 2020. It focuses on group of women trying to help and support in the fight against the COVID-19 pandemic.

Appearances

 Mara Brock Akil
 Lake Bell
 Alison Brie
 Connie Britton 
 Nkechi Okoro Carroll
 Rosario Dawson 
 Beanie Feldstein
 Jane Fonda 
 Jennifer Garner
 Elizabeth Gillies
 Kathryn Hahn
 Rachael Harris
 Cheryl Hines
 Sarah Jeffery
 Marta Kauffman
 Javicia Leslie
 Melanie Liburd
 Catt Sadler
 Andrea Savage
 Sherri Shepherd
 Alexandra Shipp
 Rain Valdez
 Michaela Watkins
 Kym Whitley
 Alfre Woodard

References

External links
 

2020 television specials
August 2020 events in the United States
Television shows about the COVID-19 pandemic
Cultural responses to the COVID-19 pandemic